The Snead Mound is a Native American mound in the southwestern portion of the U.S. state of Ohio. Located off U.S. Route 52 near the community of Neville, it lies in woodland atop a bluff.

Due to its location on a bluff and its distance from all known prehistoric settlements, the Snead Mound is believed to be the work of the Adena culture.  This identification is not conclusive, for the mound has never been excavated.  Nevertheless, as an almost-undisturbed burial mound constructed by an ancient mound-building culture, the Snead Mound is a significant archaeological site.  Because it has never been excavated, it doubtless still contains the remains of the individual or individuals buried by its builders.  In recognition of its archaeological value, it was listed on the National Register of Historic Places in 1974.

References

External links
 from the Ohio Historical Society

Archaeological sites in Ohio
Adena culture
National Register of Historic Places in Clermont County, Ohio
Archaeological sites on the National Register of Historic Places in Ohio
Mounds in Ohio